Alma Mabel Conner (February 12, 1927  – January 31, 2018), known professionally as Ann Gillis, was an American actress, best known for her film roles as a child actress. She performed the voice of Faline in the 1942 Disney animated film Bambi.

Biography 
Gillis was born in Little Rock, Arkansas. She started her career in the early 1930s, when she was age 7. After small roles, she got her first major part in King of Hockey (1936). In the following years, she played supporting roles, and  Warner Brothers Pictures wanted her to be another Shirley Temple, but she mostly played "spoiled brats".

Among her bigger roles were Becky Thatcher in David O. Selznick's The Adventures of Tom Sawyer (1938) and Annie in Little Orphan Annie (1938). She also provided the voice of Faline in Bambi (1942).

She ended her Hollywood film career in 1947 and married her second husband, British actor Richard Fraser in 1952. Following her Hollywood career, she turned to occasional television work in the UK. Gillis appeared in two episodes of The Saint in 1964-1965, followed by a small part in 2001: A Space Odyssey, playing Dr. Poole's mother. She is seen onscreen congratulating her son on his birthday. She later lived in Belgium.

On January 31, 2018, Gillis died in a nursing home in Horam, East Sussex, England.

Filmography

References

Bibliography
 Best, Marc. Those Endearing Young Charms: Child Performers of the Screen (South Brunswick and New York: Barnes & Co., 1971), pp. 95–99.

External links

 
 
 Ann Gillis at the American Film Institute

1927 births
2018 deaths
20th-century American actresses
Actresses from Little Rock, Arkansas
American child actresses
American expatriates in Belgium
American expatriates in England
American film actresses
American radio actresses
Warner Bros. contract players